Odysseus' Gambit  is a 2011 documentary film, directed by Alex Lora Cercos, about a homeless Cambodian immigrant who maintains his livelihood and sanity by playing chess in the heart of Manhattan. The film was nominated for the Best Short Filmmaking Award at the 2012 Sundance Film Festival.

Plot
Saravuth Inn was one of the most interesting human beings you could find in New York's Union Square. There, he used to play chess with people, getting 5 dollars for each game that would allow him to make it in the city one more day. Through the rules of chess and his conversations with other players and walkers, we got to know the story of this American of Cambodian origin who was airlifted after the Vietnam war to find a better life. But unfortunately, those good intentions got trapped in a glitch of the capitalist system.

Reception
 Odysseus’ Gambit entered more than 70 film festivals and received multiple awards, including the Golden Dragon for Best Short at 52nd Krakow Film Festival and Best Documentary award at the 29th Tehran International Short Film Festival.

References

External links

Further reading
 The Exacerbation of Being Nothing Ejected Press, 2020 

2011 films
American documentary films
Films about chess
Films set in Manhattan
Documentary films about homelessness in the United States
Documentary films about New York City
Documentary films about immigration to the United States
2011 documentary films
2010s English-language films
2010s American films